The American Freestyle Association (AFA) was the first governing body for BMX freestyle in the 1980s.  It was founded by Bob Morales in 1981. The first contest was held at Lakewood, Ca in 1981. Pioneer Riders in 1981 were Eddie Fiola, William Crazy Lacy Furmage, Fred Becker, Tony Ray Davis and Richard Bailey - The AFA started out as the Amateur Skate Park Association promoting events at skateboard parks and gained early notoriety with a series call the "King of the Skateparks" series. BMX Action magazine covered these events helping to bring attention to this new sport. During that time BMX Freestyle consisted of Vert competition and the Flatland Division. The AFA was so popular that virtually every state throughout the country held local events.

The AFA Masters series was a national event that featured riders coming to compete from all over the country. The events consisted of novice, intermediate, expert and pro class divisions.

In 1986 the AFA held its largest Masters event at The Nassau Coliseum with over 300 riders attending the competition.

By 1989 the AFA had closed down due a sluggish economy, lack of BMX bike sales and mainstream coverage.

Although the AFA closed down, some of its top riders continue to compete to this day. Dave Mirra, Dennis McCoy and Mat Hoffman, all former Haro Designs sponsored riders, carried the sport to the Xgames, which is the showcase event for BMX Freestyle throughout the World today.

The AFA had virtually every bicycle manufacturer sponsored riders compete in their competitions to promote individual stars and bike sales. All competitions were covered by BMX Plus, BMX Action, and Freestylin Magazine.

GT bicycles, Haro Designs, Dyno, Mongoose, Skyway, Schwinn, DiamondBack, Kuwahara, CW, SE Racing, MCS Bicycles, General Bicycles, Redline, Murray, Hutch, Awesome Shoes/CW and Ozone were all involved in sending the riders to compete in the AFA Masters. Companies were responsible for sponsoring all of these incredible riders along by sending them to each of the AFA contests, sending the riders on a one, two or three month summer tour throughout the US. These shows took place at bike shops, shopping centers, sporting events and many other locations. The riders would get paid not only from their sponsors but from the AFA competitions and the tour shows they performed at. In addition to touring many riders also spent time teaching Freestyle BMX at the world famous Woodward Camp. 

Bicycles sponsors were not the only ones to get in the mix, Vision Street Wear, Vans, Awesome Footwear, Airwalk and Lifes a Beach clothing were heavily present sponsors. Southern California had one of the biggest presence in Freestyle BMX and many locations all had breeding grounds for insane athletes. San Diego was known for many of the ground, street and vert riders. LA had a mixture of all kinds of ramp and flatland riders which reached out to Venice Beach. Camarillo was known for its ramp and flatland riders who seemed to be in just about every issue of BMX Plus and Freestylin doing bike tests. Northern California also had an incredible group of riders that really pushed the sports transition from clean colored riders to street wearing guys who shunned away from bright colors. Pennsylvania was another hot area with riders like Mark Eaton and Kevin Jones progressing the sport to new levels. Detroit area cultivating such riders as Chase Gouin, Bill Neuman and James McGraw. New York, Chicago and Florida showed a lot of talent in its riders. 

GT Bicycles was represented by
Eddie Fiola
Bob Morales
Martin Aparijo
Josh White 
Krys Dauchy
Brian Scura
Jason Geoffrey
Gary Pollack
Goro Tamai
 Rick Allison
 Ron Wilkerson
 Bill Neuman

Dyno was represented by
Bob Morales
Dino Deluca
Dave Voelker
Brett Hernandez
Rubin Castillo
Danny Sirkin

Haro Designs was represented by
Bob Haro
 Tony Ray Davis - 1982
Bob Morales
Eddie Fiola
Ron Wilton
Joe Gruttola
Dennis Mccoy
Rick Moliterno
Mat Hoffman
Dave Mirra
Dave Nourie
Brian Blyther
Ron Wilkerson

Mongoose Bicycles was represented by
Trevor Hernandez
Rick Allison
Paul Mackles
Chris Laushua
Marty Schlesinger
Park Carter
Karl Rothe
Steve Broderson

Schwinn was represented by
Danny Lupold
Robert Peterson
Jonathan Garcia
Jason Parkes
Pete Augustin
Ron Wilton
Jim Johnson

DiamondBack was represented by
Mike Dominguez
Woody Itson

General Bicycles was represented by
RL Osborn
Fred Blood
Brian Belcher
Chris Day
Mark Roldan
Todd Anderson
Chris Rothrock
Redline was represented by
RL Osborn
Todd Andeson

Hutch was represented by
Mike Dominguez
Woody Itson
Rick Moliterno
Dennis Langlias
 Chris Potts
 Rick Allison

Murray was represented by
Rich Sigur

Skyway was represented by
Kevin Jones
Mark Mckee
Mat Hoffman
Scotty Freeman
Maurice Meyer
Hugo Gonzales
Eddie Roman

Ozone was represented by
Eric Emerson
Pete Brandt
Carly Garcia
Oscar Gonzales
Gerry Smith
Derek Schott
 Derek Oriee
 Jeff Cotter
 Ken Powers
Leo Chen

MCS Bicycles
Mike Karanik

Kuwahara
R.L. Osborn
Bob Morales
Eddie Fiola
Jay Jones
Kris Ketchum
Mike Loveridge
Randy Tischman
 Ron Camero
 Roland Rascon
 Mario Aguirre
 Derek Oriee
 Greg Flowers

SE Racing
William "Crazy Lacy" Furmage
Tony Ray Davis
Eddie Fiola
Larry Manayan
Denny Howell

CW BICYCLES
John "Dizz" Hicks
Gary Pollack
Ceppie Maes
Eric Evans
 Tim Rogers
AWESOME SHOES/CW
 Derek Oriee
 Jeff Cotter
 Ron Camero
 Chris Potts
 Stefan Scholz
 Eddie Montelongo
 Tim Rogers

References
23mag.com
Bob Morales
Eddie Fiola
joekidonastingray.com

BMX
Tim Rogers represented Hutch and Kuwahara also